The 1938 Fulham West by-election was held on 6 April 1938.  The by-election was held due to the death of the incumbent Conservative MP, Cyril Cobb.  It was won by the Labour candidate Edith Summerskill.

References

Fulham West by-election
Fulham West,1938
Fulham West by-election
Fulham West,1938
Fulham